is a PlayStation Vita rhythm game, released by Bandai Namco Entertainment on December 10, 2015. Though a title of The Idolmaster series, its game system is drawn from Taiko no Tatsujin. Aka-ban features earlier music in the original The Idolmaster series, and Ao-ban features music from the 2nd Vision games; both versions contain 40 songs. The game received a score of 32 out of 40 from the Japanese video game magazine Famitsu.

References

External links
 

2015 video games
Bandai Namco games
Japan-exclusive video games
Music video games
PlayStation Vita games
PlayStation Vita-only games
Must Songs
Video games developed in Japan
Single-player video games